A paper sack is a packaging type that can be constructed of one or several layers of high quality kraft paper, usually produced from virgin fibre. Paper sacks can also be referred to as industrial paper bags, industrial paper sacks or multi-wall paper bags or sacks. They are not to be confused with paper bags, the term which usually refers to paper carrier bags, or paper shopping bags.

Paper sacks are normally used for transporting powdery or granulated materials, such as cement, building materials, food powders like flour and sugar, animal feed and seeds, charcoal etc.

Multi-wall paper sacks are designed to provide strong product protection, with high elasticity  and high tear resistance, for products with high demands for safety and durability. They usually consist of several layers of heavy duty kraft paper. Information such as instructions, logos or trademarks can be printed on the resistant outer surface. Plastic films  or different dispersions are sometimes used as inner layers or coatings to provide a barrier against moisture, water vapour, grease, oxygen, odours and bacteria.

Paper sacks are produced on paper sack converting machines consisting of tuber and a bottomer.

Paper sack and sack kraft paper manufacturing

Sack Paper manufacturing
Main articles: Kraft process and Paper machine

Wood pulp for sack paper is made from softwood by the kraft process. The long fibers provides the paper its strength. Sack paper is then produced on a paper machine from the wood pulp. Both white and brown grades are made. The paper is microcrepped to give porosity and elasticity. Microcrepping is done by drying with loose draws, allowing the fibres to shrink. This is causing the paper to elongate 4% in machine direction and 10% in cross direction before busting. Machine direction elongation can be further improved by pressing between very elastic cylinders causing more microcrepping. The paper may be coated with polyethylene (PE) or different dispersions to ensure an effective barrier against moisture, grease and bacteria. A paper sack can be made of one or several layers of sack paper depending on the toughness needed.

Paper sack manufacturing
The production of paper sacks is an entirely automatic process. It is divided into two main parts: tube forming and bottom folding. The sack kraft paper used for the production is printed on its way to the tube forming. In the first step of tube forming, paper and film (if applied) can be vent-hole perforated to improve the air permeability. They are combined by glue at the cross-pasting unit afterwards and glue is then also applied at the edge of the paper layers. In the next step, paper and film are formed into a continuous tube. Individual tubes are separated by a perforating knife. After accumulating these individual tubes, they are bundled at the shingling conveyer. These bundles are transported from the tuber to the bottomer. There, at least one end of the tube is folded to a bottom that creates the paper sack. Afterwards, the paper sacks are transported to a press section, which ensures efficient paste distribution and adhesion. The production process is monitored by electronic inspection systems and machine operators.

The production process slightly varies depending on the type of sack. All paper sacks are tailor-made and cater to the specific area of usage, product type and transportation needs.

Sack types and sizes
There are many different types of paper sacks available for the various end uses. The most common sack types are valve sacks, pinch bottom sacks, SOS (self opening sacks) sacks  and (pasted) open mouth sacks.

Valve sacks have a valve for filling and sealing in a corner of the paper sack. The valve system in a corner of the sack allows high-speed filling with automatic closing as the sack is filled to its capacity. This type of sack is used to pack especially powdered products such as cement, flour and cocoa.

The pinch bottom sack is a usually leak-proof open mouth sack, that is used for products such as chemicals or food stuffs which must be particularly protected during transport and storage.

An SOS sack has a high stability and makes quick open mouth filling easy, while also being able to be reclosed. SOS sacks are used for granulated products such as food products or animal feed. They have a rectangular bottom and high stability faculties and can also be used as a compost sack or refuse sack. Pasted open mouth sacks can also be SOS sacks and differentiate themselves due to their glued bottom area, which increases their strength.

Paper sacks are available in different sizes and can carry loads up to 50 kilos. The capacity is variable and paper sacks also come in a variety of calipers, basis weights, and treatments.

Properties

Paper sacks are usually made of Kraft paper having the advantage of being soft and strong at the same time.  The stretch or elongation increases the energy required to break the material. They carry and protect products up to 50 kg, and adapt easily to the nature of their contents and to handling constraints. Depending on the product, the weight ratio of a paper sack to its contents can be up to 1:250. The strength is due to the arrangement of the fresh fibres used in kraft paper production. Due to the fibres bonding together in production not only the strength, porosity and elasticity, but also the tear-resistance improves.

One of the natural and unique characteristics of sack kraft paper is its porosity. Acting as a filter material, high-porosity paper enables the air used in the filling process for dry powdery goods to escape very quickly, without the need for air extraction systems. This makes it possible to achieve filling speeds of up to 3,5 sec for a 25 kg sack.

Thanks to different paper sack constructions with glue, barrier, layer or surface concepts, paper sacks can also be moisture resistant. All moisture-proof sacks are compatible with regular paper sack filling machines. In especially adverse weather conditions, an extremely thin bioplastic, plastic or other adequate barrier film can be part of the surface layer in the paper sack construction for particularly effective protection.

Added barrier film liners can also extend the shelf life in a range of different conditions. There are many different sack constructions especially designed to offer a good shelf life when paper sacks are exposed to extreme conditions such as damp, moisture, light, oxygen or carbon dioxide. Also, the correct storage and handling of paper sacks along the supply chain has a positive influence on their shelf life.

Paper sacks also provide an outlet for promotional messages and sophisticated printing designs. Due to their natural, non-slippery texture and their construction, paper sacks can safely be handled, stacked, palletized and stored. User-friendly opening systems, such as a tear-open flap, allow quick and clean access to the product without the use of additional tools such as knives.

Testing  and assurance
Filled bags or sacks can be evaluated in the field by careful observation. Laboratory package testing is often conducted using drop testing, shock table testing, puncture testing, etc.

Paper sacks for food require specific quality assurance and hygiene management along the entire supply chain, as they must be in line with several national and international standards regarding the safety and hygiene of the stored food products. All materials of the sack need to be taken into account to fulfil these requirements. In Europe, there are several mandatory procedures to collect, evaluate and document all necessary information. Under certain conditions, migration testing and the issuing of compliance documents is demanded. Most of those requirements concern the conditions of use, storage time and temperature. Information on these aspects from all suppliers is a prerequisite.

Applications
Paper sacks are used for building materials such as  cement, mortar and gypsum, chemicals, minerals, animal feed, food products such as milk powder, sugar, starch, flour or oats, seeds, and other miscellaneous items such as green cuttings.

Sustainability aspects
The raw material used for the production of sack kraft paper – cellulose fibre extracted from wood – is a renewable and natural resource. The fibres used to produce sack kraft paper are extracted from tree thinning and from process waste from the timber industry. The long strong fibres are biodegradable and can be recycled several times. The recycled fibres are used as secondary raw materials in the paper industry.

The carbon footprint of an average European paper sack is analysed since 2007. The studies have shown continuous improvement, as the carbon impact of paper sacks has been reduced by 28% in eleven years between 2007 and 2018. In 2018, the carbon footprint of an average European paper sack from cradle-to-gate is 85g CO2e per sack. If the biogenic emissions and biogenic removals were included in the analysis, it would amount to -35g CO2e per sack, which means that paper sacks have a positive impact on the environment.

Associations
EUROSAC is the European Federation of multiwall paper sack manufacturers. It was created in 1952 and is headquartered in Paris. It represents over 75% of European paper sack manufacturers. Its members operate in 20 different countries. Sack manufacturers from all continents and bag manufacturers also contribute to the federation as corresponding members, and more than 20 suppliers (paper, film, machine or glue manufacturers) are registered as associate members.

CEPI Eurokraft is the European Association for producers of sack kraft paper for the paper sack industry and kraft paper for the packaging industry. It was established in the 1930s to represent the Swedish, Norwegian and Finnish kraft paper manufacturers and now has eleven member companies in twelve countries.

Ganpati Packaging Pvt. Ltd. is a leading manufacturer of Multiwall Paper Sacks based in Kolkata, India.

References

 Yam, K. L., "Encyclopedia of Packaging Technology", John Wiley & Sons, 2009, 
 Steven P. Miteff and Diana Twede. 1990. Open-Ended Bag Problems; An Investigation of Multiwall Paper CSB Bag Closure Failures Reported in India and Recommended Solutions.  MSU School of Packaging Project 1 Special Report No 27.

External links
European federation of multiwall paper sack manufactures

Paper
Packaging
Bags